Relâche is a 1924 ballet by Francis Picabia with music composed by Erik Satie.

The title was thought to be a Dadaist practical joke, as relâche is the French word used on posters to indicate that a show is canceled, or the theater is closed. The first performance was indeed canceled, due to the illness of Jean Börlin, the principal dancer, choreographer, and artistic director of the Ballets Suédois.

Picabia commissioned filmmaker René Clair to create a cinematic entr'acte to be shown during the ballet's intermission. The film, simply titled Entr'acte, consists of a scene shown before the ballet and a longer piece between the acts. The nonsensical film features Picabia, Satie, and other well-known artists as actors.

References

1924 compositions
Ballets by Erik Satie
1924 ballet premieres
Francis Picabia